Aleglitazar is a peroxisome proliferator-activated receptor agonist (hence a PPAR modulator ) with affinity to PPARα and PPARγ, which was under development by Hoffmann–La Roche for the treatment of type II diabetes.  It is no longer in phase III clinical trials.

References

Oxazoles
Benzothiophenes
Carboxylic acids
Phenol ethers
PPAR agonists